Hongtu Boulevard Station, is a station of Line 2, Line 3 and Line 8 of Wuhan Metro. It entered revenue service on December 28, 2015. It is located in Dongxihu District. This station is the interchange station of Line 2, Line 3 and Line 8.

Station layout

References

Wuhan Metro stations
Line 2, Wuhan Metro
Line 3, Wuhan Metro
Line 8, Wuhan Metro
Railway stations in China opened in 2015